Streptomyces rimosus is a bacterium species in the genus Streptomyces.

Uses 
The antibiotics oxytetracycline and tetracycline are produced in cultures of S. rimosus. Paromomycin has also been isolated from cultures of S. rimosus.

Polyketide synthesis 
S. rimosuss oxytetracycline polyketide synthase acyl carrier protein differs from most ACPs by having a C-terminus extension.

References

External links 
Type strain of Streptomyces rimosus at BacDive -  the Bacterial Diversity Metadatabase

rimosus